The 2018 National Dreamtime Awards were the 2018 event of the National Dreamtime Awards, held on 16 November 2018 at The Star, Sydney and hosted by Luke Carroll. The Awards program was broadcast nationally on NITV.

2018 Dreamtime Award recipients
The following individuals and organisations were awarded prizes in their various categories:

 Dreamtime Person of the Year – Bruce Pascoe
 Dreamtime Lifetime Achievement – Archie Roach
 Dreamtime Elder – Aunty Thelma Weston
 Male Music Artist – Baker Boy
 Female Music Artist – Mojo Juju
 Male Actor – Baykali Ganambarr
 Female Actor – Leah Purcell
 Media Person of the Year – Allan Clarke
 Male Sportsperson – Latrell Mitchell
 Female Sportsperson – Ashleigh Barty
 International Sportsperson – Tai Tuivasa
 Best New Sports Talent – Harley Windsor
 Community Person – Uncle Steve Hall
 Business of the Year – Red Centre Enterprises
 Community Organisation – Redfern Aboriginal Medical Service
 Educator of the Year – Nicole Watson
 Educational Institute of the Year – NAISDA Dance College
 Student of the Year – Ashley Walker

References

2018
Indigenous Australia-related lists
2018 in Australian music